The Guinean People's Party (PPG) was a small political party in Guinea-Bissau.

History
The party was established by João Tátis Sá following his unsuccessful candidacy in the 1999–2000 presidential elections. It joined the United People's Alliance for the 2004 parliamentary elections, which won a single seat in the National People's Assembly.

Sá ran for president again in 2005, but finished last in a field of 13 candidates.

References

Defunct political parties in Guinea-Bissau